Ipak verujem u sebe (trans. Nevertheless, I Believe in Myself) is the third studio album from Serbian and former Yugoslav rock band Galija.

Track listing
All the songs were written by Nenad Milosavljević (music) and Predrag Milosavljević (lyrics).
"Još uvek sanjam" – 5:32
"Svet kroz šareno staklo" – 4:18
"Školarci" – 4:20
"Ja sam od onih" – 5:03
"Vreme ti je za žene" - 4:20
"Burna pijana noć" – 4:45
"Da li postoji put" – 7:47
"Ipak verujem u sebe" – 2:29

Personnel
Nenad Milosavljević - vocals, acoustic guitar, harmonica
Predrag Milosavljević - vocals
Branislav Radulović - guitar
Zoran Radosavljević - bass guitar
Dragan Miloradović - keyboards
Ljubomir Mišić - drums

References 
 EX YU ROCK enciklopedija 1960-2006,  Janjatović Petar;  

Galija albums
1982 albums
PGP-RTB albums